António Pinho (25 February 1899 – 24 February 1999) was a Portuguese footballer who played as defender.

International career
Pinho played in Portugal's first ever international game, on 18 December 1921 in Madrid against Spain, a match which Portugal lost 1–3. He gained a total 12 caps for the national team.

References

External links
 
 
 

1899 births
1999 deaths
Association football defenders
S.L. Benfica footballers
Casa Pia A.C. players
Portugal international footballers
Portuguese footballers